Luan Chagas (born 9 November 1989) is a Brazilian mixed martial artist who competed in the Welterweight division of the Ultimate Fighting Championship.

Background
Chagas was born in Navirai, Brazil and he attended Karate classes at the early age and was the children's champion in the sport in Brazil. He started training BJJ at Gile Ribeiro gym after he moved to Curitiba where he received his black belt in 2015. He transitioned to MMA later and started competing in MMA and won the welterweight championship for Curitiba Fight Pro.

Mixed martial arts career

Early career
Chagas stated his professional MMA career on 28 July 2012 and he fought all his fights in Brazil. He was the Curitiba Fight Pro middleweight champion and amassed a record of 14-1 prior signed by UFC.

Ultimate Fighting Championship
In his UFC debut, Chagas faced Sérgio Moraes as a late replacement, on 14 May 2016 at UFC 198 in Curitiba, Brazil. Chagas started the fight with a barrage of punches on round one and dropped Moraes on round two with a leg kick. Moraes took down Chagas but was not able to score a submission. After three rounds, the fight was declared a draw.

His next UFC fight was in September 2016 against Erick Silva at UFC Fight Night: Cyborg vs. Lansberg.  He lost the fight via submission on round three. The fight earned him the Fight of the Night award.

On 3 June 2017, he faced Jim Wallhead at UFC 212.  He submitted Wallhead via a rear-naked choke on round two and won the fight.

Chagas was scheduled to face Niko Price on 28 October 2017 UFC Fight Night: Brunson vs. Machida. on 6 October 2017, it was announced that Chagas has fractured his foot and was pulled out from the bout.

Chagas faced Siyar Bahadurzada on 21 April 2018 at UFC Fight Night 128. He lost the fight via knockout in round two.

With his last bout being the last of his UFC contract, Chagas became a free agent.

Fighting style
With his Karate and Muay Thai background, Chagas use kicking for his fighting strategy.  He throws sharp chopping low kicks and also utilizes wheel and head kicks to try to score a knockdown.  He is a competent wrestler and enjoy throwing flurry lunging strikes on the early round.

Personal life
Chagas moniker "Tarzan" was coined after where he was from, Navirai, Mato Grosso do Sul in Brazil where 65% of the Brazilian Pantanal, a natural region encompassing largest tropical wetland area in the world.

Mixed martial arts record

|-
|Loss
|align=center|15–3–1
|Siyar Bahadurzada
|KO (kick to the body and punch)
|UFC Fight Night: Barboza vs. Lee
|
|align=center|2
|align=center|2:40
|Atlantic City, New Jersey, United States
|
|-
|Win
|align=center|15–2–1
|Jim Wallhead
|Submission (rear-naked choke)
|UFC 212
|
|align=center|2
|align=center|4:48
|Rio de Janeiro, Brazil
|
|-
|Loss
|align=center|14–2–1
|Erick Silva
|Submission (rear-naked choke)
|UFC Fight Night: Cyborg vs. Lansberg
|
|align=center|3
|align=center|3:57
|Brasília, Brazil
|
|-
|Draw
|align=center|14–1–1
|Sérgio Moraes
|Draw (split)
|UFC 198
|
|align=center|3
|align=center|5:00
|Curitiba, Brazil
|
|-
|Win
|align=center|14–1
|Eduardo Garvon
|Submission (rear-naked choke)
|Imortal Fighting Championship 2
|
|align=center|1
|align=center|4:14
|São José dos Pinhais, Brazil
|
|-
|Win
|align=center|13–1
|Edvald de Oliveira
|TKO
|Frontline Fight Series 1
|
|align=center|2
|align=center|0:00
|São José dos Pinhais, Brazil
|
|-
|Win
|align=center|12–1
|Julio Cesar Andrade
|Submission (armbar)
|Max Fight 15
|
|align=center|2
|align=center|1:27
|Ilha Comprida, Brazil
|
|-
|Win
|align=center|11–1
|Julio Cesar Bilik
|Submission (rear-naked choke)
|Curitiba Fight Pro
|
|align=center|1
|align=center|4:22
|Curitiba, Brazil
|Won vacant Curitiba Fight Pro Welterweight Championship.
|-
|Win
|align=center|10–1
|Christian Ferreira
|Submission (armbar)
|Power Fight Extreme 12
|
|align=center|2
|align=center|1:59
|Curitiba, Brazil
|
|-
|Win
|align=center|9–1
|Allan Simon
|TKO (punches)
|Curitiba Fight Pro
|
|align=center|1
|align=center|2:16
|Curitiba, Brazil
|
|-
|Win
|align=center|8–1
|Roberto Ordza
|Submission (triangle choke)
|Samurai Fighting Championship: Power Fight Extreme 10
|
|align=center|1
|align=center|1:42
|Curitiba, Brazil
|
|-
|Win
|align=center|7–1
|Silas Robson de Oliveira
|TKO (punches and knees)
|Watch Out Combat Show 28
|
|align=center|3
|align=center|5:00
|Curitiba, Brazil
|
|-
|Win
|align=center|6–1
|Edson Lopes
|Submission (rear-naked choke)
|Power Fight Extreme 9
|
|align=center|1
|align=center|4:57
|Curitiba, Brazil
|
|-
|Loss
|align=center|5–1
|Lorival Lourenco Jr.
|Submission (rear-naked choke)
|Gladiator Combat Fight
|
|align=center|2
|align=center|1:46
|Curitiba, Brazil
|
|-
|Win
|align=center|5–0
|Jose Luiz Domingues da Silva
|Submission
|Adventure Tournament 4
|
|align=center|1
|align=center|2:22
|Curitiba, Brazil
|
|-
|Win
|align=center|4–0
|Everton Souza
|TKO (punches)
|Striker's House Cup 23
|
|align=center|1
|align=center|1:29
|Curitiba, Brazil
|
|-
|Win
|align=center|3–0
|Cassio Pit
|Submission (rear-naked choke)
|Striker's House Cup 22
|
|align=center|1
|align=center|2:02
|Curitiba, Brazil
|
|-
|Win
|align=center|2–0
|Adriano Carvalho
|TKO (punches)
|G1: Open Fight 14
|
|align=center|1
|align=center|0:45
|Siqueira Campos, Brazil
|
|-
|Win
|align=center|1–0
|Alex Morales
|TKO (punches)
|Face the Danger 3
|
|align=center|1
|align=center|N/A
|Curitiba, Brazil
|
|-

See also 
 List of current UFC fighters
 List of male mixed martial artists

References

External links 
 
 

1993 births
Living people
Brazilian male karateka
Brazilian practitioners of Brazilian jiu-jitsu
People awarded a black belt in Brazilian jiu-jitsu
Brazilian male mixed martial artists
Welterweight mixed martial artists
Mixed martial artists utilizing karate
Mixed martial artists utilizing Brazilian jiu-jitsu
Ultimate Fighting Championship male fighters
Sportspeople from Mato Grosso do Sul